Unified Mobile Application for New-age Governance (UMANG) is a mobile app, a Digital India initiative of Ministry of Electronics and Information Technology (in short form MeitY), by the Government of India for access to central and state government services. The app supports 13 Indian languages and is available for Android, iOS and Windows.

The app is aimed at all citizens of India and offers hundreds of services including payment, registration, information search and application forms. It is a component of the Digital India initiative, intending to make government services available to the general public online and around the clock.

The app was developed by the Ministry of Electronics and Information Technology with the National e-Governance Division and launched in November 2017 by Prime Minister Narendra Modi at the Global Conference on Cyberspace in New Delhi. At launch the app offered 162 services from 33 state and central government departments and four states.

See also 
 Aarogya Setu
 BharatNet
 T App Folio
 CoWIN

References 

Electronic funds transfer
Mobile payments
Online payments
Payment systems
E-government in India